The Crimean Bridge: Made with Love! is a 2018 Russian state-funded film directed by Tigran Keosayan.

Plot 
The Crimean Bridge is being built in Kerch, a city in eastern Crimea, during the summer. Two men at the construction site are pursuing an archeology student named Varya: Viktor, a PR man from Moscow who arrives in a white convertible with an American television crew, and Dima, a young and ambitious builder. Meanwhile, Bernard is trying to accomplish his dream of marrying an American and going to Hollywood.

Cast
 Aleksey Demidov as Dima
 Katerina Shpitsa as Varya
 Artyom Tkachenko as Viktor Felixovich Onegin, PR man
 Sergei Nikonenko as Talib Nazirovich, Crimean Tatar
 Yuri Stoyanov as boss
 Irina Rozanova as Lara
 Sergei Gazarov as Ashot
 Sofya Zayka as Marina
 Laura Keosayan as Nika, Bernard's ex-girlfriend
 Larisa Malevannaya as Raisa
 Aleksandr Dmitriev as Tikhon
 Alyona Khmelnitskaya as Tikhon's mother
 Aleksandr Ilyin Sr. as Mikhalych
 Dmitry Kartashov as Bernard
 Yelena Myravyova as Rachel
 Yegor Bakulin as Max
 Kristina Kucherenko as Aliya
 Valentin Samokhin as Oliver Stone

Production
Filming took place in the Kerch Strait and on the island of Tuzla on a construction site where the supports and metal spans of the Crimean bridge were being installed. Actors worked close to engineers, installers and welders. Some scenes were filmed alongside residents of the Crimea and the Kuban.

Reception
The film attracted scathing reviews, and was even the lowest-rated film on several film review aggregators. Russian opposition politician Alexey Navalny released a video in March 2020, alleging serious corruption during the production of the film, with at least 46 million rubles in state funds intended for film production being siphoned off to Simonyan's relatives. It flopped at the box office, recovering only 70 million rubles, less than half of its 154 million ruble budget.

Cinemas in Kazakhstan refused to screen this film, citing no interest from local movie-goers.

References

External links 
 

Russian romantic comedy films
2018 romantic comedy films
Films set in Crimea
Russian propaganda films